Selshion is a townland in County Armagh, Northern Ireland. It is within the Armagh, Banbridge and Craigavon District Council area, on the western edge of the town of Portadown.

References

External links
NI Neighbourhood Information System
Craigavon Area Plan 2010

Townlands of County Armagh